Too Dumb for Democracy? Why We Make Bad Political Decisions and How We Can Make Better Ones is a 2019 book by political scientist David Moscrop.

The book discusses how people make decisions against their best interests, explains why, and advocates for more careful analysis of political information.

It received positive critique from The Toronto Star.

Publication 
Too Dumb for Democracy? was published in 2019 by Goose Lane Editions and was written by political scientist David Moscrop.

Synopsis 
The book focuses on why people make political decisions against their own self-interest, documenting the extent to which people are manipulated by bad-faith actors.

In the book, Moscrop argues that democracy is under threat but can be saved, emphasising the need for good process to resolve disagreements.

The book documents the neuroscience of human decision making, and breaks decisions into two types that Moscrop calls "autopilot" and "long-form", stating that people too frequently rely on the former when the later would serve them better. He writes of the importance of wanting to make better decisions and learning how to do so.

Critical reception 
Christine Sismondo, writing in The Toronto Star, describes the book as highly-readable as well as noting the strength of the arguments contained.

References

External links 
 Official website

2019 non-fiction books
Political literature
Canadian political books
Political science books
Goose Lane Editions books